Lê Thanh Hải (born 20 February in Tiền Giang province)  served as Secretary of the Hồ Chí Minh City Party Committee from 2005 to 2015. Lê Thanh Hải was a member of the 11th Politburo, in which he is ranked 6th.

Early life
Lê Thanh Hải was born on  20 February 1950 in Tiền Giang province. In 1966, he went to Saigon as a welder and joined the propaganda team of the Sài Gòn – Gia Định Youth Union with the alias Hai Nhựt.

Lê Thanh Hải became member of the Communist Party of Vietnam in 1968. From 1968 to April 1975, he was deputy secretary of the communist party committee, member of the executive committee of the Sài Gòn – Gia Định Union, Member of the Standing Committee of the Party Committee, deputy head of the Youth Union Permanent member of Thanh Tan Youth Workers' Committee, Member of Phú Tân Sơn District People's Committee

References

1950 births
Living people
Members of the 10th Politburo of the Communist Party of Vietnam
Members of the 11th Politburo of the Communist Party of Vietnam
Members of the 9th Central Committee of the Communist Party of Vietnam
Members of the 10th Central Committee of the Communist Party of Vietnam
Members of the 11th Central Committee of the Communist Party of Vietnam
People from Tiền Giang province